Thomas Tayebwa  (born 10 November 1980) is a member of the Parliament of Uganda since 2016, and has served as Deputy Speaker of the Parliament since 2022. He was appointed as the Government Chief Whip by Yoweri Kaguta Museveni.  Since 2016, he serves as the Member of Parliament for Ruhinda North County in Mitooma District and a member of NRM. He became known for beating a UMEME employee on a leaked video, for which he apologized on 29 August 2020. He served as a member of National Economy Committee and Natural Resources Committee. On 25 March 2022, he was elected by fellow MPs as the Deputy Speaker of Uganda's 11th Parliament, taking over from Among who moved up to be the Speaker of the Parliament, all events following the death of Speaker Jacob Oulanyah.

Background and education
Tayebwa was born to Bangirana Daudi and Abbie Komuhangi of Bitereko Village in Mitooma District.
He attended Kigarama Primary School, Kigarama Senior Secondary School and Ruyonza School for UACE in 2000. In 2005, he received a BA in Social Sciences at Makerere University, and in 2012 he received a Bachelor of Law degree from Makerere as well.

Roles
Tayebwa serves as the director of Cholmat Investments.

Politics
In October 2015, Tayebwa joined elective politics on the NRM ticket, winning both the party's primaries with 15092 votes and 2016 Ugandan general election thereby becoming a member of The Tenth Parliament for The Pearl of Africa representing Ruhinda North County in Mitooma District.  He served as a member of National Economy Committee and Natural Resources Committee in the 10th parliament(2016-2021).

On March 25, 2022, Tayebwa was voted as Deputy Speaker of the Parliament of Uganda succeeding Anita Among in the 11th parliament.

Personal life
On 14 February 2009, Tayebwa married Anita Rukundo at St. Augustine Chapel in Makerere, Kampala. They have one child.

Torture allegations 
On 21 August 2020, Tayebwa's home in Busaabala was visited by a Umeme employee, identified as Bukenya Bonny, to disconnect the power supply. According to Umeme management, Tayebwa had failed to pay multiple electricity bills and had illegally reconnected the building to the grid. Tayebwa was reported to police by Umeme for allegedly torturing Bonny on video. Tayebwa is heard saying: “How many canes are remaining? Add him two as my bonus” On 29 August 2020 Tayebwa and Bukenya reached a settlement in which Tayebwa apologized and Bukenya dropped charges.

References

External links 

Website of the Parliament of Uganda
visiblepolls.org
www.elections.co.ug

Living people
1980 births
People from Western Region, Uganda
Makerere University alumni
21st-century Ugandan lawyers
Members of the Parliament of Uganda
National Resistance Movement politicians
Legislative deputy speakers